Willie Perry Milner (born June 21, 1972 in Atlanta, Georgia) is a former offensive tackle in the National Football League. He attended Northside High School in Atlanta. Milner attended the University of Houston, where he was a third-team college All-American and the team's MVP. He was drafted 25th in the first round of the 1995 NFL Draft by the Miami Dolphins. He started 9 games as a rookie, earning a spot on the all rookie team. He was traded to the St. Louis Rams his second season for tight end Troy Drayton and suffered a career ending neck injury in his third season derailing a promising career. Milner now resides in Sunrise, Florida, with his wife Sabrina and daughter Breana, he also has a son (Maxwell) who lives in Houston, Texas.

References

1972 births
Living people
Players of American football from Atlanta
American football offensive tackles
Southwest Mississippi Bears football players
Houston Cougars football players
Miami Dolphins players
St. Louis Rams players